The 2011–12 Ligakupa was the fifth edition of the Hungarian League Cup, the Ligakupa.

First group stage

Group A

Group B

Group C

Group D

Group E

Quarterfinals
The matches will be played on 22 February and 7 March 2012.

Semifinals
The matches will be played on 27 and 28 March and 4 April 2012.

Final

Goalscorers
As of 18 April 2012, there have been 237 goals (including 6 own goals) scored by 132 different players.

7 goals
   Nemanja Nikolić (Videoton)

5 goals

  Francis Litsingi (Kecskemét)
  Zsolt Gévay (Paks)
  Ádám Hrepka (Paks)
  István Ferenczi (Pápa)

4 goals

   Adnan Alisic (Debrecen)
  Vjatšeslav Zahovaiko (Debrecen)
  Gergő Lovrencsics (Pápa)

3 goals

  János Ferenczi (Debrecen)
  Norbert Tóth (Gyirmót)
  Jammeh Haruna (Kaposvár)
  Attila Tököli (Kecskemét)
  József Magasföldi (Paks)
  Tibor Montvai (Paks)
  Gábor Vayer (Paks)
  Dávid Barczi (Újpest)
  Péter Rajczi (Újpest)
  Gergő Beliczky (Vasas)
  Gábor Kovács (Zalaegerszeg)

2 goals

  Lucas (Debrecen)
  Krisztián Budovinszky (Diósgyőr)
  José Luque (Diósgyőr)
   L´Imam Seydi (Diósgyőr)
  Bálint Nyilasi (Ferencváros)
  Máté Kiss (Győr)
  Bence Serfőző (Győr)
  Dieng Cheikh Abass (Honvéd)
  Gergely Délczeg (Honvéd)
  Sándor Torghelle (Honvéd)
  Zoltán Farkas (Kaposvár)
  Miroslav Grumić (Kaposvár)
  László Lencse (Kecskemét)
  Attila Simon (Kecskemét)
  Béla Lakatos (Mezőkövesd)
  Patrik Tischler (MTK)
   Norbert Könyves (MTK)
  Zoltán Szabó (Pápa)
  Gábor Tóth (Pápa)
  Vadims Žuļevs (Pápa)
  Péter Bajzát (Pécs)
   Thomas Sowunmi (Siófok)
  Ferenc Kalmár (Szolnok)
  Máté Skriba (Szombathely)
  Roland Ugrai (Szombathely)
  Balázs Balogh (Újpest)
  Bradley Hudson-Odoi (Vasas)
  Marko Šimić (Vasas)
  André Alves (Videoton)
  Milan Perić (Videoton)
  Sándor Torghelle (Videoton)
  Dušan Vasiljević (Videoton)
  Vlad Bujor (Zalaegerszeg)

1 goals

   Selim Bouadla (Debrecen)
  Balázs Farkas (Debrecen)
  Bence Ludánszki (Debrecen)
  Roguy Méyé (Debrecen)
   Mirsad Mijadinoski (Debrecen)
  László Rezes (Debrecen)
  István Spitzmüller (Debrecen)
  Péter Szilágyi (Debrecen)
  Vicente Arze (Diósgyőr)
  George Menougong (Diósgyőr)
  Szabolcs Pál (Diósgyőr)
  Tibor Tisza (Diósgyőr)
  Viktor Vadász (Diósgyőr)
  László Fitos (Ferencváros)
  Krisztián Lisztes (Ferencváros)
   Lóránt Oláh (Ferencváros)
  Péter Pölöskey (Ferencváros)
  Szilárd Domanyik (Gyirmót)
  Gábriel Homonyik (Gyirmót)
  Bence Lannert (Gyirmót)
  László Varga (Gyirmót)
  Patrik Vass (Gyirmót)
  Rati Aleksidze (Győr)
  Nicolas Ceolin (Győr)
  Ádám Dudás (Győr)
  Tibor Molnár (Győr)
  Dániel Völgyi (Győr)
  Danilo (Honvéd)
  Richárd Vernes (Honvéd)
  Károly Graszl (Kaposvár)
  Olivér Kovács (Kaposvár)
  Bojan Pavlović (Kaposvár)
  Aleksandar Alempijević (Kecskemét)
  Gábor Bori (Kecskemét)
  Vladan Čukić (Kecskemét)
  Dávid Mohl (Kecskemét)
  László Pekár (Kecskemét)
   Kelvin Maynard (Kecskemét)
  Vladan Savić (Kecskemét)
  Andrei Enescu (Mezőkövesd)
  Dénes Olasz (Mezőkövesd)
  Norbert Palásthy (Mezőkövesd)
  Sándor Török (Mezőkövesd)
  Csaba Vámosi (Mezőkövesd)
  Norbert Csiki (MTK)
  Richárd Frank (MTK)
  Dávid Kelemen (MTK)
  László Bartha (Paks)
  Dániel Böde (Paks)
  Tamás Kiss (Paks)
  Tamás Sifter (Paks)
  Gábor Tamási (Paks)
  Jože Benko (Pápa)
   Goran Marić (Pápa)
  Gábor Varga (Pápa)
  Péter Andorka (Pécs)
  Gábor Demjén (Pécs)
  Zsolt Horváth (Pécs)
  Dávid Pákolicz (Pécs)
  Marko Šćepanović (Pécs)
  Gábor Simonfalvi (Pécs)
  Zoltán Tóth (Pécs)
  Bojan Božović (Siófok)
  András Fejes (Siófok)
  Norbert Lattenstein (Siófok)
  Dániel Lengyel (Siófok)
  Vilmos Melczer (Siófok)
  Krisztián Mile (Szolnok)
  Richárd Czafit (Szombathely)
  Attila Simon (Szombathely)
  Goran Vujović (Szombathely)
  István Bognár (Újpest)
  Bence Lázár (Újpest)
  Darko Marković (Újpest)
   Mohamed Remili (Újpest)
  Krisztián Simon (Újpest)
  Bence Szabó (Újpest)
  Zoltán Takács (Újpest)
  Szabolcs Üveges (Újpest)
   Electo Wilson (Újpest)
  József Boda (Vasas)
  Csaba Ferkó (Vasas)
   Haris Mehmedagić (Vasas)
  Áron Mészáros (Vasas)
  Evandro Brandão (Videoton)
  Walter Fernández (Videoton)
  Ádám Gyurcsó (Videoton)
  Nikola Mitrović (Videoton)
  György Sándor (Videoton)
  Dániel Nagy (Videoton)
  Tamás Vaskó (Videoton)
  Tamás Szalai (Zalaegerszeg)

2 own goal
  Péter Máté (Debrecen) (playing against Diósgyőr and Vasas)
1 own goal

  Zsolt Antal (Ferencváros) (playing against Pécs)
  Bence Ludánszki (Debrecen) (playing against Paks)
  Dragan Vukmir (MTK) (playing against Gyirmót)
  Héctor Sánchez (Videoton) (playing against Gyirmót)

External links
 soccerway.com

2011–12 in Hungarian football
2011–12 domestic association football cups
2011-12